Charlie Mark Birch (born 23 October 2001) is an English footballer who plays as a defender for Penrith.

Early and personal life
Birch was born in Carlisle, as the son of former professional footballer Mark Birch.

Career
Birch started his career at Carlisle United and made his debut for the club on 21 December 2019 as a substitute in a 3–0 defeat away to Colchester United. In February 2020, he was offered a professional contract with the club, signing a one-year contract with the club. Birch was very excited to be offered a professional contract, stating that he was 'over the moon'. In September 2020, Birch joined Northern Premier League Division One North West side Kendal Town on a season-long loan deal. He scored once in 13 appearances for the club before his loan was cut short due to the COVID-19 pandemic. He was released by the club at the end of his contract in summer 2021.

On 10 July 2021, Birch signed for Scottish League Two side Annan Athletic; Birch made his debut for the club that same day in a 1–1 Scottish League Cup draw against Airdrieonians, with Birch scoring Annan's third penalty in a 5–4 shoot-out win.

On 7 January 2022, Birch signed for Northern League Division One side Penrith.

Career statistics

References

External links

2001 births
Living people
Footballers from Carlisle, Cumbria
English footballers
Association football defenders
Carlisle United F.C. players
Kendal Town F.C. players
Annan Athletic F.C. players
Penrith F.C. players
English Football League players
Northern Premier League players
Northern Football League players